Julián Castillo Calderón de la Barça (January 23, 1880 - December, 1948) was a Cuban baseball first baseman in the Cuban League and Negro leagues.

Castillo played from 1899 to 1914 with several Cuban League ballclubs, including Almendares, Club Fé and Habana. He also played in the Negro leagues in 1911 for the Cuban Stars (West) and the All Cubans. He was elected to the Cuban Baseball Hall of Fame in 1943.

References

External links

1880 births
1948 deaths
Cuban League players
Almendares (baseball) players
Club Fé players
Cuban Stars (West) players
Eminencia players
Habana players
Punzo players
San Francisco (baseball) players
Baseball players from Havana